Leppington is an electoral district of the Legislative Assembly in the Australian state of New South Wales in Sydney's south-west. The electoral district is due to be contested for the first time at the 2023 New South Wales state election.

The electorate will include the suburbs of Austral, Carnes Hill, Catherine Field, Cecil Hills, Cecil Park, Denham Court, Eagle Vale, Eschol Park, Horningsea Park, Hoxton Park, Kearns,  Kemps Creek, Leppington, Middleton Grange, Prestons, Raby, Rossmore, Varroville and West Hoxton.

History
Leppington was created as a result of redistribution by the New South Wales Electoral Commission in 2021. The electorate takes suburbs from the existing districts Camden, Liverpool and Macquarie Fields.

See also
Electoral district of Camden
Electoral district of Liverpool
Electoral district of Macquarie Fields

References

External links
New South Wales Redistributions 2021

Electoral districts of New South Wales